Statistics of Libyan Premier League for the 1990–91 season.

Overview
Al-Ittihad (Tripoli) won the championship.

References
Libya - List of final tables (RSSSF)

Libyan Premier League seasons
1
Libya